Guido Sebastian Corteggiano (born June 23, 1987) is an Argentine footballer who currently plays for AC Mestre.

Career
During his professional career he mainly played for Italian Serie D clubs, where capped 211 matches and scored 12 goals. Also he spent one season in Eccellenza (fifth level in Italian football), where capped 30 matches and scored 5 goals.

In July 2017 he signed 1 year deal with the Ukrainian Premier League side FC Karpaty Lviv. He made his debut in the Ukrainian Premier League for FC Karpaty on 16 July 2017, playing in a match against FC Zirka Kropyvnytskyi.

On 22 September 2018, A.C. Mestre announced the signing of Corteggiano.

References

External links
 
 
 Profile at Carrierecalciatori 
 

1987 births
Living people
Footballers from Buenos Aires
Argentine footballers
A.C. Cuneo 1905 players
A.C. Bra players
U.S. Triestina Calcio 1918 players
Calcio Lecco 1912 players
Argentine expatriate footballers
Expatriate footballers in Italy
Argentine expatriate sportspeople in Italy
Expatriate footballers in Ukraine
Argentine expatriate sportspeople in Ukraine
Ukrainian Premier League players
FC Karpaty Lviv players
Association football defenders